Antony Guss (born 9 January 1959) is an Australian alpine skier. He competed in three events at the 1980 Winter Olympics.

References

1959 births
Living people
Australian male alpine skiers
Olympic alpine skiers of Australia
Alpine skiers at the 1980 Winter Olympics
Skiers from Melbourne